Rashid Ahmed Al-Mannai (Arabic: أحمد راشد المناعي; born 18 June 1988) is a Qatari track and field athlete who specialises in the high jump and triple jump.

Biography
Born in Doha, he started competing internationally in 2005 and finished eleventh at the 2005 World Youth Championships in Athletics and set a personal best of 2.10 metres for 14th at the 2005 Asian Athletics Championships. He competed at the 2006 World Junior Championships in Athletics in Beijing the following year, but did not get past the qualification round. He finished twelfth at the 2006 Asian Games later that year, jumping 2.10 metres.

He enjoyed his first regional successes in 2007 – he set a Qatari record of 2.24 metres to take the gold medal at the 2007 Asian Indoor Games (a mark which was also a Games record). He represented Qatar at the 2007 Pan Arab Games in November and won a silver medal behind Salem Al-Anezi, with a jump of 2.17 m. A few months later, he returned to action with an appearance at the 2008 Asian Indoor Athletics Championships in his hometown. The high jump gold went to Sergey Zasimovich but Al-Mannai still reached the podium, taking the bronze medal.

He set an outdoor national record in Doha in April 2008, clearing 2.20 m for the win and an outdoor best. After a year out from competition, Al-Mannai returned by setting a personal best of 2.27 m in Malmö, which earned him an appearance at the 2010 IAAF Continental Cup. Representing the Asia-Pacific team, he cleared both 2.21 m and 2.25 m on his second attempts, but he cleared the bar first time at 2.28 m – a new personal best and closer to Mutaz Essa Barshim's new Qatari record. It was a surprise win over 2007 World Champion Donald Thomas and marked the first high jump medal and victory by an Asian at the competition.

Competition record

External links
 Rashid Al-Mannai Profail on iaaf

References

1988 births
Living people
People from Doha
Qatari male high jumpers
Athletes (track and field) at the 2006 Asian Games
Athletes (track and field) at the 2010 Asian Games
Athletes (track and field) at the 2014 Asian Games
Athletes (track and field) at the 2018 Asian Games
Asian Games medalists in athletics (track and field)
Qatari male triple jumpers
Asian Games bronze medalists for Qatar
Medalists at the 2010 Asian Games
IAAF Continental Cup winners